Fritz Honegger (25 July 1917 – 4 March 1999) was a Swiss politician.

He was elected to the Swiss Federal Council on 7 December 1977 and handed over office on 31 December 1982. He was affiliated to the Free Democratic Party. 

During his time in office he held the Federal Department of Economic Affairs and was President of the Confederation in 1982.

External links

1917 births
1999 deaths
People from Weinfelden District
Swiss Calvinist and Reformed Christians
Free Democratic Party of Switzerland politicians
Members of the Federal Council (Switzerland)
Members of the Council of States (Switzerland)
Politics of the canton of Zürich